Martin Iosefo (born January 13, 1990) is an American rugby union player who previously played several seasons with the United States national rugby sevens team. He now plays for the Seattle Seawolves in Major League Rugby (MLR).

Early life
Iosefo grew up in Wahiawa on the island of Oahu in Hawaii where he learned to play rugby. Between the ages of 4 and 15 he lived in Samoa with his brother and father. 

After finishing Leilehua High School in Wahiawa, he went to the University of Montana to play wide receiver in American football as a walk-on. 

Iosefo started playing rugby competitively while in Missoula, Montana with the University of Montana Jesters. Iosefo played with the Men's Collegiate All-Americans at the 2014 Serevi RugbyTown Sevens.
Iosefo played with the Denver Barbarians at the 2015 Club 7s Nationals.

Iosefo has been recognized for his size and athleticism, as well as for his hard hits at defense as a centre.

U.S. national rugby sevens team
Iosefo debuted with the U.S. national rugby sevens team at the 2014 Dubai Sevens. Iosefo missed the 2015 Hong Kong Sevens and the 2015 Japan Sevens due to school commitments, but rejoined the team for the 2015 London Sevens.

Iosefo was part of the U.S. team that won bronze at the 2015 Pan Am Games. Iosefo also played for the U.S. at the 2015 NACRA Sevens where the United States beat Canada in the final 21–5 to qualify for the 2016 Summer Olympics.

Iosefo made the "dream team" for the 2016 Canada Sevens. At the 2016 London Sevens, Iosefo scored a try 11 seconds into the match against Fiji, one of the fastest tries in the World Series. Iosefo played for the U.S. at the 2016 Summer Olympics in Rio, where the team finished in ninth place.

Career statistics
As of the end of 2021, Iosefo was ranked among the top U.S. players for statistics on the World Rugby Sevens Series:

References

American rugby union players
People from Hawaii
1990 births
Living people
Pan American Games medalists in rugby sevens
Pan American Games bronze medalists for the United States
Rugby sevens players at the 2015 Pan American Games
Montana Grizzlies football players
United States international rugby union players
Medalists at the 2015 Pan American Games
Rugby sevens players at the 2020 Summer Olympics
Olympic rugby sevens players of the United States
Rugby union centres
Rugby union wings
Seattle Seawolves players